Olha Valentinivna Zubaryeva (born January 27, 1958) is a former Soviet/Ukrainian handball player who competed in the 1980 Summer Olympics.

In 1980 she won the gold medal with the Soviet team. She played all five matches and scored 21 goals.

External links
profile

1958 births
Living people
Soviet female handball players
Ukrainian female handball players
Handball players at the 1980 Summer Olympics
Olympic handball players of the Soviet Union
Olympic gold medalists for the Soviet Union
Olympic medalists in handball
Sportspeople from Kyiv
Medalists at the 1980 Summer Olympics